Maksym Averin (born 28 November 1985) is a Ukrainian-born Azerbaijani former professional cyclist, who rode professionally in 2004 and from 2012 to 2017, for the Lokomotiv,  and  teams. In May 2017, Averin was given a backdated 15-month ban, having tested positive for meldonium the previous December.

Personal life
His father Aleksandr Averin also competed professionally as a cyclist.

Major results

2002
 3rd  Team pursuit, UEC European Junior Track Championships
2011
 2nd Trofeo Edil C
 3rd Coppa della Pace
 10th Circuito del Porto
2013
 1st Stage 4 Tour of China I
2014
 1st Poreč Trophy
2015
 National Road Championships
1st  Road race
1st  Time trial
 1st Stage 2 Okolo Slovenska
 2nd Trofej Umag
 3rd Poreč Trophy
 5th Duo Normand (with Ioannis Tamouridis)
 5th GP Izola
 7th Overall Tour d'Azerbaïdjan
1st  Azerbaijan rider classification
 7th Croatia–Slovenia
 8th Odessa Grand Prix I
 10th GP Laguna
2016
 National Road Championships
1st  Road race
2nd Time trial
 1st Stage 2 Tour d'Azerbaïdjan

References

External links

 

1985 births
Living people
Azerbaijani male cyclists
Ukrainian male cyclists
Cyclists at the 2016 Summer Olympics
Olympic cyclists of Azerbaijan
Naturalized citizens of Azerbaijan
Sportspeople from Lviv